The Cooper Mk.V, is a series of three different Formula 3 cars, designed, developed and built by Cooper Cars in 1951. Like its predecessor, it used a  JA Prestwich Industries (JAP) single-cylinder engine, or a  JA Prestwich Industries (JAP) V-2 engine. The first version was the short-wheelbase Cooper T15; which featured a box-section chassis frame, detachable body panels, and a rack-and-pinion steering system. The second version was the long wheelbase Cooper T16, which featured a lengthened wheelbase to be able to equip the larger  engine. And the third and final version, the Cooper T17; which was a special streamliner version land speed record attempt car for speed record attempts, and sometimes, used for fast road racing circuits.

References 

Cooper racing cars
Formula Three cars